Wiebes is a surname. Notable people with the surname include:

 Eric Wiebes (born 1963), Dutch politician
 Lorena Wiebes (born 1999), Dutch racing cyclist

See also
 Wiebe (surname)